

Arthropods

Newly named insects

Vertebrates

Archosauromorphs

Dinosauria
Data courtesy of George Olshevsky's dinosaur genera list.

Birds

Popular culture

Literature
 Savage Pellucidar, the last of the seven novels about Pellucidar, an underground world inhabited by dinosaurs and other prehistoric creatures, by Edgar Rice Burroughs was published.

References

 
Paleontology
Paleontology 3